Ginestra Bianconi is a network scientist and mathematical physicist, known for her work on statistical mechanics, network theory, multilayer and higher-order networks, and in particular for the Bianconi–Barabási model of growing of complex networks and for the Bose–Einstein condensation (network theory) in complex networks. She is a professor of applied mathematics at Queen Mary University of London, and the editor-in-chief of Journal of Physics: Complexity.

Education and career
Bianconi earned a laurea in physics from Sapienza University of Rome in 1998, advised by Luciano Pietronero, and a PhD from the University of Notre Dame in 2002, advised by Albert-László Barabási.

After postdoctoral research at the University of Fribourg in Switzerland and the International Centre for Theoretical Physics in Italy, she became an assistant professor at Northeastern University in 2009. She moved to Queen Mary University of London in 2013, and became professor there in 2019. Since 2018 she is an Alan Turing Fellow at the Alan Turing Institute.

Book
Bianconi is author of the books Multilayer Networks: Structure and Function (Oxford University Press, 2018) and Higher-Order Networks: An introduction to Simplicial Complexes (Cambridge University Press, 2021). She also coedited the book Networks of Networks in Biology (Cambridge University Press, 2021).

Honours
Bianconi received the Network Society Fellowship in 2020.

References

External links
 Home page at QMUL
 Home page at Alan Turing Institute
 

Year of birth missing (living people)
Living people
21st-century Italian mathematicians
21st-century Italian physicists
Women mathematicians
Italian women physicists
Mathematical physicists
Sapienza University of Rome alumni
University of Notre Dame alumni
Northeastern University faculty
Academics of Queen Mary University of London